Ibrahim Mater Al-Harbi (born 10 July 1975) is a retired Saudi Arabian football midfielder.

Career
Al-Harbi played club football for Al-Nassr and Ohud. He also played for the national team, with which he participated in the 1996 Summer Olympics and 1998 FIFA World Cup.

References

External links

1975 births
Living people
Saudi Arabian footballers
Saudi Arabia international footballers
Association football midfielders
Olympic footballers of Saudi Arabia
Footballers at the 1996 Summer Olympics
1996 AFC Asian Cup players
1997 FIFA Confederations Cup players
1998 FIFA World Cup players
1999 FIFA Confederations Cup players
AFC Asian Cup-winning players
Al Nassr FC players
Ohod Club players
Sportspeople from Riyadh
Saudi First Division League players
Saudi Professional League players